The Dakotas is a collective term for the U.S. states of North Dakota and South Dakota. It has been used historically to describe the Dakota Territory, and is still used for the collective heritage, culture, geography, fauna, sociology, economy, and cuisine of the two states.

Etymology
The name "Dakota" refers to the Dakota people.

History

The territory now known as the Dakotas includes a large portion of the ancestral land of Native American tribes, in particular various tribes of Sioux such as the Dakota people, also known as the Santee Sioux. The United States government stakes its claim to the land through the Louisiana Purchase and Rupert's Land accusation. The region historically involved a complex series of conflicts between the US government and Native American tribes (and among themselves).

For a while the region consisted of the Minnesota and Nebraska territories until in 1861, the US government formed the Dakota Territory, which included both the modern states of North and South Dakota but also large swaths of present day Montana and Wyoming. The fall of 1861 resulted in a poor harvest
and was followed by a harsh winter, leading to extreme hardship for the Dakota in the
region. Desperate for food and money, they were denied loans by local traders.
A series of raids in the spring of 1862 ultimately resulted in Dakota War of 1862 between
the US government and the Dakota people. The US won the war, the aftermath which
included a mass hanging of 38 people on December 26, 1862, the largest mass execution in US history. The remaining Santee Dakota people were exiled by the US government to the
Dakota Territory.

The end of the war did not solve the conflicts between Native Americans and the Americans. Fighting would continue, for example along the Bozeman Trail, until the Treaty of Fort Laramie in 1868. The treaty established the Great Sioux Reservation and "designated the Black Hills as 'unceded Indian Territory' for the exclusive use of native peoples." The subsequent discovery of gold in the Black Hills in 1874 by George Armstrong Custer's Black Hills Expedition, would cause a gold rush and the US to violate the treaty. The Indian Appropriations Act of 1876 went into effect on August 15, 1876. This was referred to as "sell or starve" by the Native Americans and led to the Great Sioux War of 1876. The conflict between the Sioux and miners and the US forces backing them would culminate in the Battle of the Little Bighorn, also known as "Custer's Last Stand", the most significant battle of the war. Despite being a Sioux victory, Battle of the Little Bighorn preceded the Agreement of 1877 which took away the Black Hills and forced Native Americans onto reservations (see Black Hills land claim) and left the Sioux with little means to address their grievances. 

Before he left office, President Cleveland signed a bill on February 22, 1889 halving the Dakota Territory along their modern borders. This bill was ratified by Congress, and President Harrison eventually signed the paper work create the US states of North Dakota and South Dakota on November 2, 1889, deliberately signing such that it was unknown which was officially created first.

The debate over the land within the Dakotas, specifically the Black Hills, is unsettled. The Sioux in 1920 began a legal battle over their ancestral lands within the US system of justice. Sixty years later, the US Supreme Court upheld in 1980's United States v. Sioux Nation of Indians case that tribal land was illegally taken from the Sioux and ruled they deserved financial compensation. The Sioux Nation has refused the offer because the land was "never for sale" and wants the land back.

Overview
The two states combined have a population of 1,670,324, slightly less than Idaho, ranking at 39th place. The Dakotas have a total area of 147,878 square miles (383,177 square kilometers), which would rank 4th among U.S. states, right before Montana. The two states also have a population density of 9.8 per sq. mi (3.8 per km2).

The Dakotas are within the Midwestern United States, with the western portion in the High Plains. The PBS miniseries New Perspectives on the West noted historically important areas within the Dakotas, including the Black Hills, the town of Deadwood, Fort Buford, Standing Rock Reservation and Wounded Knee. The Upper Missouri River and the Upper Missouri River Valley are important geological features in the area, as well.

The area is mostly inhabited by people of Northern European origin. 44.9% of the population are of German ancestry, 21.8% of Norwegian, and 9.6% are of Irish heritage.

Both of the Dakotas have humid continental climate, with warm to hot summers and cold to even subarctic temperatures in winter. Due to the difference in circle of latitude, temperatures differ by degrees between the southern and northern areas, even inside the respective states.

Main cities
The following are the top twenty-two most populous cities in The Dakotas. Pierre, South Dakota, and Bismarck, North Dakota, are the respective state capitals. 
 Sioux Falls, South Dakota- 192,517
 Fargo, North Dakota- 125,990
 Rapid City, South Dakota- 74,703
 Bismarck, North Dakota- 73,622
 Grand Forks, North Dakota- 59,166
 Minot, North Dakota- 48,377
 West Fargo, North Dakota- 38,626
 Williston, North Dakota- 29,160
 Aberdeen, South Dakota- 28,495
 Dickinson, North Dakota- 25,679
 Mandan, North Dakota- 24,206
 Brookings, South Dakota- 23,377
 Watertown, South Dakota- 22,655
 Jamestown, North Dakota- 15,849
 Mitchell, South Dakota- 15,660
 Yankton, South Dakota- 15,411
 Huron, South Dakota- 14,263
 Pierre, South Dakota- 14,091
 Spearfish, South Dakota- 12,193
 Box Elder, South Dakota- 11,746
 Vermillion, South Dakota- 11,695
 Brandon, South Dakota- 11,048

See also
The Californias
The Canadas
The Carolinas
The Floridas
The Virginias

References

Further reading
 McMacken, R. (2006) Off the Beaten Path: The Dakotas. Globe Pequot.

External links
 Historic map of the Dakotas

Divided regions
Midwestern United States
Regions of the United States
Geography of North Dakota
Geography of South Dakota